Sohag Markaz is a Metropolitan area province in Sohag Governorate in upper Egypt. It contains the Governorate capital of Sohag.

Sohag Governorate